Marrangaroo is a village in the Central West of New South Wales, Australia in the City of Lithgow.

Overview 
Marrangaroo is located a few kilometres west of Lithgow. It is accessible from the Great Western Highway, and has no railway station and little bus services. Lithgow Buslines, run buses between Lithgow and Bathurst, which makes limited stops at Marrangaroo on the Great Western Highway. A main feature of Marrangaroo was the Trout Farm which was opposite the Lithgow Correctional Centre. At the 2016 census, Marrangaroo had a population of 909.

Military 

Marrangaroo Army Camp situated at the end of Reserve Road used to be a major ammunition depot from 1941 to the late 1980s. It was served by a three kilometres siding that branched off from the Main Western railway line from March 1942 until May 1988. It is now used for demolitions and various training by all three Australian Defence Force services. During World War II it housed chemical warfare facilities; at the time, one of Australia's best kept secrets. Marrangaroo was the administration headquarters for all of the Royal Australian Air Force Chemical Weapon Stores which were kept in tunnels and sidings at Marrangaroo (old tunnel and siding near correctional centre), Glenbrook Tunnel in the Blue Mountains, Clarence Tunnel (that is now part of the Lithgow Zig Zag) and Picton tunnel in Sydney's south.

During an interview with Plunkett in 2005, chemical warfare armourer, Geoff Burn mentioned he had been involved in the burial of  phosgene bombs near the entrance to the headquarters in 1943. He was subsequently recalled from Cairns in 1944 to identify the site but was unsure as to whether and if the bombs had been extracted. After Burn marked the site on an aerial map a ground search revealed they were still there. The legacy of these weapons remains with several hundred empty chemical munition containers being found buried at Marrangaroo Army Camp from May 2008 to February 2009.

A remediation project to remove heavy metal contamination started in November 2008 with a secondary task to remove any more buried chemical munitions. The revelation of Marrangaroo's history sparked significant local media interest. The Department of Defence established a website for community consultation and feedback on the decontamination.

Transport 

A railway station opened at Marrangaroo on the Main Western line in 1878 and closed in 1974. Little trace of it remains. Also, it has been suggested as the western terminus for the proposed Bells Line Expressway. But this now unlikely to proceed.

Shale oil 
During the calendar  years 1943 to 1945 inclusive, Lithgow Oil Proprietary Ltd, at Marangaroo, produced around 2,000,000 gallons of crude shale oil. Under wartime conditions, that company had designed and constructed its own NTU retorts based on information from a Bureau of Mines publication. The crude shale oil was refined at the Glen Davis Shale Oil Works. The Marangaroo oil shale deposit was small but exceptionally rich, assaying 237 gallons per long ton.

Heritage listings 
Marrangaroo has a number of heritage-listed sites, including:
 Main Western railway: Marrangaroo railway viaduct

References

External links 
Media in Wikimedia Commons under Category: Marrangaroo, New South Wales

 
Towns in New South Wales
Mining towns in New South Wales
Shale oil towns in New South Wales